In taxonomy, "Tetracoccus" is a genus of the Alphaproteobacteria.

References

Further reading

Scientific journals

Scientific books

Scientific databases

External links

Bacteria genera
Alphaproteobacteria